Killarney was an unincorporated community in Raleigh County, West Virginia, United States.

Notable People
Peggy O'Neal, President of the Richmond Football Club (2013-present) and Chancellor of RMIT University (2021-present)

References

Unincorporated communities in West Virginia
History of West Virginia
Former populated places in West Virginia
Coal towns in West Virginia